"I Don't Know Where to Start" is a song written by Thom Schuyler, and recorded by American country music artist Eddie Rabbitt.  It was released in April 1982 as the third single from the album Step by Step.  The song reached number 2 on the Billboard Hot Country Singles & Tracks chart and number 35 on the Billboard Hot 100, his last solo top-40 pop hit.

Chart performance

References

1982 singles
1981 songs
Eddie Rabbitt songs
Songs written by Thom Schuyler
Song recordings produced by David Malloy
Elektra Records singles